Gavin Andrew Hoyte (born 6 June 1990) is a professional footballer who plays as a defender for Maidstone United. He has been a member of the Trinidad and Tobago national team.

Career

Arsenal

Early career
Born in Leytonstone, London, Hoyte signed with Arsenal when he was nine. He featured regularly for Arsenal's U18 and Reserve teams, and was captain of Arsenal's U18 team during 2006–07. He signed as a professional with the club on 10 September 2007.

From 2007 onwards, Hoyte featured for Arsenal on the bench as an unused substitute several times; the first in an FA Cup fifth round replay against Blackburn Rovers on 28 February 2007. He then featured in four of Arsenal's five games in the 2007–08 League Cup campaign, against Newcastle United, but was always an unused substitute.

2008–09 season
Hoyte played two first-team matches in Arsenal's 2008 pre-season friendly campaign, and was named captain of the Arsenal Reserves side for the 2008–09 season. He made his first-team competitive debut for Arsenal in a League Cup tie against Sheffield United on 23 September 2008, playing at right back for the full 90 minutes, in a match that Arsenal won 6–0. He started in subsequent rounds in the competition against Wigan Athletic and Burnley and also made his Premier League debut against Manchester City on 22 November 2008, in which he was substituted for Aaron Ramsey after 60 minutes.

In December 2008 Hoyte signed a new long-term contract with Arsenal. On 31 December 2008 Hoyte joined Championship side Watford on loan for the rest of the 2008–09 season.

2009–10 season
In October 2009, Hoyte signed on a one-month loan for Brighton & Hove Albion as cover for the injured Andy Whing. Hoyte's loan spell at Brighton was extended until January 2010, and again on 12 January until the end of the 2009–10 season.

2011–12 season
In late January 2012, Hoyte signed for League Two club AFC Wimbledon on a one-month loan deal.

In April 2012, Hoyte appeared as a trialist for League One club Stevenage, playing for their reserve team in a 6–1 loss to Southend United. On 22 May 2012 it was announced he would become a free agent on 1 July, and he would be released by Arsenal.

Dagenham & Redbridge

Following his release from Arsenal, Hoyte signed a two-year contract with Dagenham & Redbridge on 10 July 2012, becoming their first signing of the new season. He made his debut on 14 August 2012 against Coventry City in a 1–0 defeat, playing the full 90 minutes. In June 2014, he was released by Dagenham after failing to agree a new contract with the club despite being offered improved terms.

Gillingham
Following his release from Dagenham & Redbridge, Hoyte signed for Gillingham on a short-term contract. He remained with the Kent-based club until the end of the 2014–15 season.

Barnet
Hoyte signed for Barnet on a two-year deal in June 2015. He scored his first league goal in a 1–0 win over Bristol Rovers on 9 January 2016. Hoyte missed most of the 2016 calendar year after rupturing his cruciate knee ligament.

Eastleigh
Hoyte joined Eastleigh on an 18-month contract on 15 December 2016. He was released in May 2018.

Return to Dagenham
On 28 June 2018 he re-signed for National League side Dagenham & Redbridge on a one-year contract having previously spent two years at the club. He also linked up again with manager Peter Taylor whom he had played under for Gillingham. In May 2019, it was announced that he would be released following the expiration of his contract at the end of the 2018–19 campaign.

Maidstone United
Hoyte signed a one-year deal with Maidstone United in June 2019. In 2020 he was named vice-captain by manager Hakan Heyrettin.

International career
Hoyte has played for the England national under-17 football team and was a member of the England squad at the 2007 FIFA U-17 World Cup. He played in all five of England's matches in the tournament, coming on as a sub three times and starting the games against Brazil and Germany.

In May 2014, he was called up by Trinidad & Tobago to play on their South American tour which involved fixtures against Argentina in Buenos Aires and Iran in São Paulo, Brazil.

Personal life
He is the son of British sprinters Wendy Hoyte and Les Hoyte (who was born in Trinidad and Tobago), and is the younger brother of Justin Hoyte, who also played for Arsenal. His uncle, Trevor Hoyte, reached the 200m final at the 1978 Commonwealth Games and his cousin, Chris Clarke, is also an elite sprinter.

Career statistics

Club

International

Honours
England U17
UEFA European Under-17 Championship runner-up: 2007

England U19
UEFA European Under-19 Championship runner-up: 2009

References

External links

1990 births
Living people
Footballers from Leytonstone
English footballers
England youth international footballers
Citizens of Trinidad and Tobago through descent
Trinidad and Tobago footballers
Trinidad and Tobago international footballers
Association football central defenders
Arsenal F.C. players
Watford F.C. players
Brighton & Hove Albion F.C. players
Lincoln City F.C. players
AFC Wimbledon players
Dagenham & Redbridge F.C. players
Gillingham F.C. players
Barnet F.C. players
Eastleigh F.C. players
Maidstone United F.C. players
Premier League players
English Football League players
National League (English football) players
Black British sportsmen
English sportspeople of Trinidad and Tobago descent